Ron A. Villanueva (born March 30, 1970) is a former member of the Virginia House of Delegates for the 21st district, serving from 2010 to 2018. He is a Republican who first won election in 2009, defeating incumbent Democratic Delegate Bobby Mathieson in the general election. He was sworn in the following January in Richmond, Virginia. Villanueva was the first Filipino American elected to Virginia state government. He was reelected to 4 consecutive terms, but lost his bid for a 5th term on November 7, 2017.

In 2019, Villanueva pleaded guilty to fraud in regards to misuse of 8(a) Business Development Program; he was sentenced to serve  years in jail, 3 years probation, and $524,000 in restitution.

Electoral history

2016 Legislation 
Chief Patron

(after prefiled period)

Chief Co-Patron

Co-Patron

Committee assignments

2016 legislative session 
At the beginning of the 2016 legislative session, Villanueva served on the following committees:

2015 legislative session

2014 legislative session

2012-2013 legislative session

2010-2011 legislative session

External links
Virginia House of Delegates bio
Official website
Ballotpedia

References

1970 births
American politicians of Filipino descent
Living people
Politicians from Virginia Beach, Virginia
Republican Party members of the Virginia House of Delegates
Virginia city council members
Old Dominion University alumni
21st-century American politicians
Virginia politicians convicted of crimes
Asian-American people in Virginia politics
Asian conservatism in the United States